Monobia is a primarily neotropical genus of medium-sized to large potter wasps occurring from the United States to Argentina. This genus is very closely related to the genus Montezumia. It contains the following species:

Monobia angulosa Saussure, 1852 
Monobia anomala Saussure, 1852 
Monobia apicalipennis Saussure, 1852
Monobia atrorubra Ducke, 1904
Monobia biangulata Saussure, 1875
Monobia californica (Saussure, 1863) 
Monobia caliginosa Willink, 1982 
Monobia carbonaria Willink, 1982
Monobia caridei Brèthes, 1906 
Monobia cingulata Brèthes, 1903 
Monobia curvata Fox, 1899
Monobia cyanipennis (Guerin, 1831)
Monobia deplanata Ducke, 1908
Monobia egregia Saussure, 1856
Monobia eremna Willink, 1982
Monobia funebris Gribodo, 1891
Monobia incarum Bequard, 1940
Monobia insueta Giordani Soika, 1969
Monobia lecointei Ducke, 1911
Monobia mochii Giordani Soika, 1973 
Monobia nayarit Willink, 1982
Monobia nigripennis Saussure, 1875
Monobia paraguayensis Berton, 1925
Monobia proeta (Cresson, 1865) 
Monobia puertoricensis Bequard, 1941 
Monobia quadridens  (Linnaeus, 1763) 
Monobia schrottkyi Berton, 1918 
Monobia scutellaris Ducke, 1911
Monobia sylvatica Saussure, 1852 
Monobia texana (Cresson, 1872) 
Monobia trifasciata Willink, 1982
Monobia yacochuyae Willink, 1982

References

Potter wasps
Taxa named by Henri Louis Frédéric de Saussure
Hymenoptera genera